Ken Holt is the central character in a series of mystery stories advertised as being for readers between the ages of eleven and fifteen years old. The series was published by Grosset & Dunlap between 1949 and 1963, and the mysteries continued to be sold in the United States until at least 1966.

Authors
Husband and wife Sam Epstein and Beryl Williams Epstein, who were the authors of over one hundred books for children and teenagers, wrote the Ken Holt books under the pseudonym of Bruce Campbell. (The name was inspired by a dog and a can of soup.) Beryl stated that "Sam does the technical chapters, and I do the 'blah' ones in between."

Series synopsis
The series advertising tagline was "Ken Holt, son of a world-famous correspondent, stumbles into a world of mystery and intrigue." In the Secret of Skelton Island, the first book in the series, it is stated that Ken’s mother died ten years before the story takes place. Ken is kidnapped, then escapes, and is helped by the Allen family, who own the Brentwood Advance, a weekly newspaper. In the last chapter it is decided that Ken will live with the Allen family, since his father is often away. Ken and Sandy Allen become best friends, and investigate mysteries together.

Editions
Grosset & Dunlap published the series in three formats. From 1949 - 1950 the first four books were bound in tan covers, and had a color illustrated dust jacket. From 1951 - 1963 the first seventeen books were bound in gray covers, with color illustrated dust jackets. Both of those formats had book spines with an illustration of Ken Holt’s head in a shield-shaped frame. From 1962 and onward books one through four, six, fifteen, and eighteen were published with picture covers that had an orange spine.

In the United Kingdom the series was published by World Distributors of Manchester during the 1950s and 60s. This edition was bound in red cloth with black titles, and had an Illustrated dust jacket.

Books in series

References

External links
Ken Holt Series
 
The Mystery of the Iron Box online at Gutenberg
Ken Holt Yahoo Group Author's Page

Book series introduced in 1949
Juvenile series
Holt, Ken
Children's mystery novels